Apollonius is a lunar impact crater located near the eastern limb of the Moon. It lies in the region of uplands to the west of Mare Undarum and northeast of the Sinus Successus on the Mare Fecunditatis. It was named after Greek mathematician Apollonius of Perga. It is southwest of the crater Firmicus, and north of Condon.

The outer rim of Apollonius is somewhat worn and is overlain by a pair of small craters (including Apollonius E) across the western wall. The nearly flat interior floor has a low albedo and has been covered by lava. It lacks a central peak or notable small craters across the bottom.

Satellite craters
By convention these features are identified on lunar maps by placing the letter on the side of the crater midpoint that is closest to Apollonius.

The following craters have been renamed by the IAU.
 Apollonius C — See Ameghino (crater).
 Apollonius D — See Cartan (crater).
 Apollonius G — See Townley (crater).
 Apollonius K — See Abbot (crater).
 Apollonius P — See Daly (lunar crater).
 Apollonius T — See Bombelli (crater).
 Apollonius W — See Petit (crater).

References

External links

 LTO-62C1 Firmicus — L&PI topographic map

Impact craters on the Moon